The 2022 ITF World Tennis Tour Maspalomas was a professional tennis tournament played on outdoor clay courts. It was the second edition of the tournament which was part of the 2022 ITF Women's World Tennis Tour. It took place in San Bartolomé de Tirajana, Spain between 8 and 14 August 2022.

Champions

Singles

  Julia Grabher def.  Nadia Podoroska, 6–4, 6–3

Doubles

  Ángela Fita Boluda /  Arantxa Rus def.  Elina Avanesyan /  Diana Shnaider, 6–4, 6–4

Singles main draw entrants

Seeds

 1 Rankings are as of 1 August 2022.

Other entrants
The following players received wildcards into the singles main draw:
  Elina Avanesyan
  Noelia Bouzó Zanotti
  Xiomara Estévez Grillo
  Marta García Reboredo
  Marta González Encinas

The following player received entry into the singles main draw using a protected ranking:
  Maria Mateas

The following players received entry from the qualifying draw:
  Paula Arias Manjón
  Gloria Ceschi
  Olivia Gram
  Lilly Elida Håseth
  Claudia Hoste Ferrer
  Lia Karatancheva
  Martha Matoula
  Radka Zelníčková

The following player received entry as a lucky loser:
  Kanako Morisaki

References

External links
 2022 ITF World Tennis Tour Maspalomas at ITFtennis.com
 Official website

2022 ITF Women's World Tennis Tour
2022 in Spanish tennis
August 2022 sports events in Spain